"Pop That" is a song by Moroccan-American rapper French Montana featuring Canadian rapper Drake and fellow American rappers Rick Ross & Lil Wayne. Released as the lead single from the former's debut studio album Excuse My French (2013), it was produced by Lee on the Beats.

Composition 
"Pop That" is a hip hop song of five minutes and four seconds in length. The song's production, composed by record producer Lee on the Beats, is built around an 808 drum pattern, and was described by Tyler McDermott of Billboard as "abrasive", also noting that it also complemented the performance of the rappers well. A looped sample of the Uncle Luke song "I Wanna Rock" – specifically, the phrase "pop that, don't stop' – is used as the song's chorus.

Music video
The music video premiered on MTV Jams on July 8, 2012. It was filmed in Miami. The-Dream made a cameo appearance.

Accolades 
Complex named the song No. 29 on their list of the 50 best songs of 2012. BET named it their No. 2 music video of 2012 on their year-end Notarized countdown.

Track listing
Digital download
 "Pop That" (featuring Rick Ross, Drake and Lil Wayne) – 5:04

Charts

Weekly charts

Year-end charts

Certifications

Release history

References

2012 singles
2012 songs
French Montana songs
Drake (musician) songs
Rick Ross songs
Lil Wayne songs
Bad Boy Records singles
Interscope Records singles
Songs written by Drake (musician)
Songs written by Lil Wayne
Songs written by Rick Ross
Songs written by Lee on the Beats
Songs written by French Montana
Dirty rap songs